Olari is a commune in Arad County, Romania, is situated on the Arad Plateau, on the Canalul Morilor, on the left bank of the river Crișul Alb. Its surface occupies 4767 ha.

Population
According to the last census, the population of the commune counts 1942 inhabitants, out of which 52.2% are Romanians, 33.2% Hungarians, 8.0% Roms, 5.2% Slovaks and 1.4% are of other or undeclared nationalities.

Natives
 Iosif Rangheț

History
The first documentary record of Olari dates back to 1746, while Sintea Mică was first mentioned in 1467.

Economy
The economy of the commune is mainly agrarian, based on growing of grain and technical crops, as well as vegetable growing.

Tourism
Being situated on a flat zone, the commune is lacking in attractive spectacles. Nevertheless, through trimming up the springs of thermal and medicinal waters, it could become a well-attended touristic place.

References

Communes in Arad County
Localities in Crișana